Khizer Hayat (Urdu: خضرحيات, born 5 January 1939) is a Pakistani former cricket player and umpire. He played first-class cricket for ten years before taking up umpiring and retired having officiated in 34 Test matches and 55 One Day International matches.

Biography
Hayat was born on 5 January 1939 in Lahore, Pakistan

Playing career
Before becoming an umpire, Hayat played in 21 first-class matches.  He played once for the Punjab A cricket team in January 1957, in the 1956/7 Quaid-e-Azam Trophy against Pakistan Railways, but failed to score a run in either innings. He then played for Pakistan Railways in January 1960, in their 1959/60 Quaid-e-Azam Trophy quarter-final match against Lahore, making small scores.  He played twice for a combined Railways and Quetta team in January 1961, helping them to win the semi-final and final of the 1960/1 Ayub Trophy, scoring 52 not out in their winning first-innings score of 468 in the final.  He played as wicket-keeper for Pakistan Railways from 1961 to 1965, scoring 121 against Pakistan Universities in December 1962, and bowling 10 balls against Karachi Blues in a losing match in March 1964. Ijaz Hussain took over as wicket-keeper in December 1964, and Hayat captained Pakistan Railways against the Sargodha cricket team, a combined Punjab University and Lahore Education Board team, and against Lahore Greens in 1964/5, making 58 in the latter match.  He played for the Pakistan Railways Greens against Karachi University and Karachi Blues in April 1966, bowling a few overs in both matches. His last two matches were played for Pakistan Railways against Hyderabad and Karachi Blues in January 1968 under the captaincy of Arif Butt.

His first-class career total was 539 runs, at a batting average of 22.45, including one century and two half-centuries. He took 15 catches and made 3 stumpings.  He bowled very occasional leg breaks, delivering only 52 balls and taking no wickets.

Umpiring career
Hayat officiated in 34 Tests from March 1980 to October 1996, and 55 One-day Internationals (ODI) from November 1978 to December 1996, mainly in Pakistan. He made his Test umpiring debut in March 1980, in the 3rd Test between Pakistan and Australia at the Gaddafi Stadium, Lahore, together with Amanullah Khan. He umpired regularly in Test matches in Pakistan until 1996.  In 1994, he and Mahboob Shah were the two Pakistani representatives on the first international panel of umpires, set up by the ICC to ensure that one neutral umpire would officiate in every Test match. He umpired in his first Test outside Pakistan in March 1994, in the match between New Zealand and India at Trust Bank Park (Seddon Park), Hamilton, together with Brian Aldridge. His last Test was the 1st Test between Pakistan and Zimbabwe at Sheikhupura Stadium in October 1996.

In December 1989, Hayat deputized as square leg umpire for John Holder, who suffered a stomach upset, in Javed Miandad's 100th Test, against India at Gaddafi Stadium, Lahore, while John Hampshire stood behind the stumps at both ends.  After the 1st Test between Australia and Sri Lanka at Perth in December 1995, Hayat was caught up in controversy when he and Peter Parker alleged that the Sri Lankan team had tampered with the ball. The Sri Lankans were later cleared by the ICC.

Hayat made his debut as an ODI umpire in the match between Pakistan and India at Zafar Ali Stadium in Sahiwal on 3 November 1978. He umpired in ODI tournaments in Sharjah, and in the 1987 Cricket World Cup in India, the 1992 Cricket World Cup in New Zealand and Australia, and the 1996 Cricket World Cup in Sri Lanka and Pakistan.  His last ODI was played between Pakistan and New Zealand at Jinnah Stadium, Sialkot on 6 December 1996.

International Umpiring statistics

References

External links

1939 births
Living people
Pakistani Test cricket umpires
Pakistani One Day International cricket umpires
Pakistani cricketers
Punjab A cricketers
Pakistan Railways cricketers
Cricketers from Lahore